Los Pekenikes were a primarily instrumental Spanish pop group of the 1960s signed to Hispavox. In 1967 Spain's national radio station selected the group to represent Spain in the Juan-Antoine de Triomphe Variete Festival promoted by French radio stations.

In 1970/'71 the group had an international hit with the single Tren transoceánico a Bucaramanga.

References

Spanish musical groups